Geomechanics (from the Greek prefix geo- meaning "earth"; and "mechanics") is the study of the mechanical state of the earth's crust and the processes occurring in it under the influence of natural physical factors. It involves the study of the mechanics of soil and rock.

Background
The two main disciplines of geomechanics are soil mechanics and rock mechanics. Former deals with the soil behaviour from a small scale to a landslide scale. The latter deals with issues in geosciences related to rock mass characterization and rock mass mechanics, such as applied to petroleum, mining and civil engineering problems, such as borehole stability, tunnel design, rock breakage, slope stability, foundations, and rock drilling.

Many aspects of geomechanics overlap with parts of geotechnical engineering, engineering geology, and geological engineering. Modern developments relate to seismology, continuum mechanics, discontinuum mechanics, and transport phenomena.

Reservoir Geomechanics 
In the petroleum industry geomechanics is used to:

 predict pore pressure
 establish the integrity of the cap rock
 evaluate reservoir properties
 determine in-situ rock stress
 evaluate the wellbore stability
 calculate the optimal trajectory of the borehole
 predict and control sand occurrence in the well
 analyze the validity of drilling on depression
 characterize fractured reservoirs
 increase the efficiency of the development of fractured reservoirs
 evaluate hydraulic fractures stability
 evaluate the effect of liquid and steam injection into the reservoir
 analyze surface subsidence
 evaluate shear deformation and casing collapse

To put into practice the geomechanics capabilities mentioned above, it is necessary to create a Geomechanical Model of the Earth (GEM) which consists of six key components that can be both calculated and estimated using field data:

 Vertical stress, δv (often called geostatic pressure)
 Maximum horizontal stress, δHmax
 Minimum horizontal stress, δHmin
 Stress orientation 
 Pore pressure, Pp
 Elastic properties and rock strength: Young's modulus, Poisson's ratio, friction angle, UCS (unconfined compressive strength) and TSTR (tensile strength)

Geotechnical engineers rely on various techniques to obtain reliable data for geomechanical models. These techniques include coring and core testing, seismic data and log analysis, well testing methods such as transient pressure analysis and hydraulic fracturing stress testing, and geophysical methods such as acoustic emission.

See also
 Earthquake engineering
 Geotechnics
 Rock mechanics

References

Additional sources

Mechanics
Earth sciences
Geotechnical engineering